Hilderaldo Luiz Bellini (7 June 1930 – 20 March 2014) was a Brazilian footballer of Italian origin who played as a defender and was known in Brazil as one of the nation's most solid central defenders ever.

Biography
During his career he played for Vasco da Gama, São Paulo FC and Atlético Paranaense, and he was the first Brazilian to lift the World Cup in 1958. He won another World Cup in 1962 and participated also at 1966 FIFA World Cup as the team captain again.

He was honored with a statue at the entrance of the Maracanã stadium, which depicts him lifting the 1958 World Cup trophy. At the end of his international career from 1957 to 1966 with Brazil he earned a total of 51 caps being the captain during the 1958 FIFA World Cup in Sweden.

Bellini is credited with starting the tradition of lifting the trophy into the air in football. He initially did this so that photographers could have a better view of the trophy and, as the photos were published around the world, the gesture became associated with victory.

Bellini died on 20 March 2014, aged 83, in São Paulo, due to complications caused by Alzheimer's disease culminating with cardiac arrest.

Shortly after his death in 2014, Brazilian footballer Bellini was posthumously diagnosed with CTE. Bellini, along with Pelé, Didi and Garrincha, led Brazil to FIFA World Cup victories in 1958 and 1962.

Honours

Club
Vasco da Gama	
Campeonato Carioca: 1952, 1956, 1958
Torneio Octogonal Rivadavia Corrêa Meyer: 1953
Torneio Rio – São Paulo: 1958

International
Brazil
FIFA World Cup: 1958, 1962

Individual
FIFA World Cup All-Star Team: 1958

References

External links

1930 births
2014 deaths
People from Itapira
1958 FIFA World Cup players
1962 FIFA World Cup players
1966 FIFA World Cup players
Brazil international footballers
Brazilian footballers
FIFA World Cup-winning captains
FIFA World Cup-winning players
Brazilian people of Italian descent
São Paulo FC players
Sportspeople with chronic traumatic encephalopathy
CR Vasco da Gama players
Club Athletico Paranaense players
Deaths from dementia in Brazil
Deaths from Alzheimer's disease
Association football defenders
Footballers from São Paulo (state)